Theloderma gordoni is a species of frog in the family Rhacophoridae. It is known from northern Thailand, northern Laos, and central to northern Vietnam. Common names Gordon's bug-eyed frog, Gordon's warted frog, and large warted treefrog have been coined for it.

Breeding takes place in water-filled tree holes and karst depressions where the tadpoles develop. It is threatened by habitat loss. It is also collected for the pet trade. It occurs in the Doi Suthep–Pui National Park in Thailand and in a number of protected areas in Vietnam.

References

gordoni
Amphibians of Laos
Amphibians of Thailand
Amphibians of Vietnam
Taxa named by Edward Harrison Taylor
Amphibians described in 1962
Taxonomy articles created by Polbot